N1-Methylpseudouridine (abbreviated m1Ψ) is a natural archaeal tRNA component as well as a synthetic pyrimidine nucleoside used in biochemistry and molecular biology for in vitro transcription and is found in the SARS-CoV-2 mRNA vaccines tozinameran (Pfizer–BioNTech) and elasomeran (Moderna).

Properties 

N1-Methylpseudouridine is the methylated derivative of pseudouridine. It is used in in vitro transcription and for the production of RNA vaccines. In vertebrates, it stimulates significantly less activation of the innate immune response compared to uridine, while the translation is stronger. In protein biosynthesis, it is read like uridine and enables comparatively high protein yields. The nucleoside itself can be made by chemical methylation of pseudouridine.

While pseudouridine can wobble-pair with bases other than A, potentially leading to mistranslated proteins, it is unclear whether this happens with m1Ψ.

History 
In 2016, a protocol for large-scale synthesis of the nucleoside triphosphate from the ribonucleoside was published. 

In 2017–2018 it was tested in vaccines against Zika, HIV-1, influenza, and Ebola.

References 

Nucleosides
Pyrimidines